La Almunia del Romeral is a locality located in the municipality of Loporzano, in Huesca province, Aragon, Spain. As of 2020, it has a population of 36.

Geography 
La Almunia del Romeral is located 24km northeast of Huesca.

References

Populated places in the Province of Huesca